Qanat Bagh (also Romanized as Qanāt Bāgh and Qanāt-i-Bāgh) is an ancient village in Aviz Rural District, in the Central District of Farashband County, Fars Province, Iran. At the 2006 census, its population was 303, in 69 families.

References 

Populated places in Farashband County